Kanturek or Kantůrek is a Czech surname. Notable people with the surname include:

Jan Kantůrek (1948–2018), Czech translator of fantasy, science fiction, comics, and westerns from English
Jaroslav Kantůrek (born 1953), Czech basketball player
Otto Kanturek (1897–1941), Austrian cameraman, cinematographer, and film director